Superman: La Atracción de Acero (meaning "Superman: The Attraction of Steel") is a steel floorless roller coaster at Parque Warner Madrid in Spain. It was built by Bolliger & Mabillard and opened on 6, April 2002. It features 7 inversions: a Vertical Loop, an Immelmann, a Spiralling Camelback, a Cobra Roll and two interlocking Flatspins. It features a straight drop, instead of a swooping drop like on most B&M looping coasters.  

In 2015, the coaster was featured in Glenn Paton's short film H Positive. Although the off-ride footage was modified to include several additional vertical loops, the on-ride footage in the film was left largely intact. The entire layout can be seen, several other attractions can be seen in the background, including Batman: Arkham Asylum, Coaster-Express, Stunt Fall, and La Venganza del Enigma.

Roller coasters in Spain
Roller coasters introduced in 2002
La Atraccion de Acero
2002 establishments in Spain
Parque Warner Madrid
Warner Bros. Global Brands and Experiences attractions
Floorless Coaster roller coasters manufactured by Bolliger & Mabillard